James, Jim, or Jimmy Martin may refer to:

Academics 
James Cullen Martin (1928–1999), American chemist
James E. Martin (1932–2017), president of the University of Arkansas and Auburn University
James Kirby Martin (born 1943), American historian

Actors, musicians, and other performers
Jimmy Martin (1927–2005), American bluegrass musician
James Martin (Irish actor), Northern Irish actor from Oscar winning An Irish Goodbye
James Martin (Scottish actor) (born 1931), Scottish actor on Still Game
James R. Martin (born 1951), American producer and director of documentaries Wrapped In Steel and Fired-up!
Jim Martin (musician) (born 1961), American guitarist formerly with Faith No More
Jim Martin (puppeteer) (born 1960), American puppeteer on Sesame Street
James and Tom Martin (born 1977), English twin musicians

Judges and lawyers 
James Loren Martin (1846–1915), U.S. federal judge
James Robert Martin Jr. (1909–1984), U.S. federal judge
James Martin (attorney), U.S. Attorney in Missouri

Military figures 
James Green Martin (1819–1878), Civil War Confederate brigadier general
James Martin II (1826–1918), American Medal of Honor recipient
James Fitzgerald Martin (1876–1958), officer of the British Army
Jim Martin (Australian soldier) (1901–1915), youngest Anzac to serve at Gallipoli
James Stewart Martin (author), Chief of the Decartelization Branch for Military Government in Germany after World War II

Politicians

Australian politicians 
Sir James Martin (premier) (1820–1886), Premier of New South Wales
James Martin (South Australian politician) (1821–1899), engineer and politician of Gawler, South Australia
James Martin (New South Wales politician, born 1850) (1850–1898), member of the New South Wales Legislative Assembly for South Sydney and Sydney-Bligh
James Martin (Queensland politician) (born 1981), Queensland politician (elected 2021)

Canadian politicians 
James Morris Martin (1845–1902), Canadian politician

Irish politicians 
James Martin (Irish politician) (1905–1969), Fianna Fáil Senator from 1965 to 1969

United Kingdom politicians 
James Martin (1738–1810), British banker and politician who sat in the House of Commons for 31 years from 1776 to 1807
James Martin (1807–1878), British Liberal Party politician and banker
James Martin (trade unionist) (1850–1933), British trade unionist and politician

United States politicians 
James Stewart Martin (congressman) (1826–1907), U.S. Representative from Illinois
Jimmy Martin (politician) (1938–2019), American politician from Alabama
James D. Martin (1918–2017), U.S. Representative from Alabama
Jimmy Leawood Martin (born 1934), American politician in South Carolina
James G. Martin (born 1935), North Carolina governor
Jim Martin (Georgia politician) (born 1945), Member of the Georgia House of Representatives
James Martin (Maine politician) (born 1965), member of the Maine House of Representatives
James Martin (mayor), Republican mayor of Ansonia, Connecticut, 1969–1971
James Martin (South Carolina politician) (died 1868), member of the South Carolina House of Representatives

Clergy
James S. Martin (evangelical minister) (fl. 1913–1914), American anti-Mormon preacher
James J. Martin (priest), American Jesuit priest and writer
James A. Martin (1902–2007), American Jesuit priest

Sportspeople 
James Martin (cricketer) (1851–1930), Australian cricketer
Jim Martin (Australian footballer) (1884–1940), Australian rules player at multiple clubs
James Martin (footballer, born 1893) (1893–1940), Scottish footballer
James Martin (footballer, born 1898) (1898–1969), English footballer
Jimmy Martin (golfer) (1924–2000), Irish golfer
Jim Martin (American football) (1924–2002), College Football Hall of Fame member
James Martin (American football) (born 1944), head college football coach at Tuskegee University
Jimmy Martin (American football) (born 1982), National Football League guard
James Marten (born 1984), American football player
James Martin (rugby league) (born 1987), British rugby player
James Martin (footballer, born 1994) (born 1994), Scottish footballer
James Martin (footballer, born 1998), English footballer
Jimmy Martin (judoka), American judoka

Writers 
James Martin (philosopher) (fl. 1577), Scottish writer
James Martin (convict) (c. 1760–?), convict transported to New South Wales, author of the only extant First Fleet convict account of life in the colony
James J. Martin (1916–2004), American historian, wrote on anarchism
James Martin (author) (1933–2013), computer systems design author, writer
James Conroyd Martin (fl. 2006–2016), historical fiction writer

Other 
James Ranald Martin (1796–1874), surgeon in India
Sir James Martin (engineer) (1893–1981), inventor of the modern aircraft ejection seat
James Slattin Martin Jr. (1920–2002), project manager for the Viking program
James Martin (chef) (born 1972), British celebrity chef
James Martin (photographer), American photojournalist
James Purdon Martin (1893–1984), British neurologist
Jim Martin (ombudsman), Scottish public servant
Spider Martin (1939–2003), American photographer
James Martin & Co, Australian engineering firm
James Henry Martin (1835-1909), British shipowner and entrepreneur
James David Martin (born 1971), American serial killer

See also 
James Edgar Martine (1850–1925), U.S. Senator from New Jersey
Jamie Martin (disambiguation)
James Martin House (disambiguation)
James S. Martin (disambiguation)
Martin High School (Arlington, Texas), also known as James Martin High School

Martin, James